Process is the debut studio album by English singer Sampha, released on 3 February 2017 by Young Turks. The album was co-produced by Sampha and Scottish music producer Rodaidh McDonald. It won the Mercury Prize for 2017.

Recording
As compared to Sampha's characteristic bedroom recording style, Process was recorded in professional recording studios. The album was primarily recorded in studios across Sampha's native city of London, although it was also partially recorded at Ocean Sound Recordings on the Norwegian island Giske.

Release and promotion
"Timmy's Prayer" was released on 17 May 2016 as a single. The album's title was revealed alongside the release of "Blood on Me" on 26 August 2016 as Process lead single. The video for the song was released on 16 September 2016 and was directed by Alex Lill. Sampha performed the song in his network television debut as a solo artist on The Late Show with Stephen Colbert on 1 September 2016. The album's track listing, artwork, and release date were revealed on 3 November 2016 with the announcement of a 2017 tour. "(No One Knows Me) Like the Piano" was released as the album's third single on 12 January 2017. Sampha performed the song on The Tonight Show Starring Jimmy Fallon the following day on 13 January 2017. A video for "(No One Knows Me) Like the Piano" directed by Jamie-James Medina was released on 31 January 2017 in standard format and in virtual reality.

In a cover story with The Fader in June 2016, Sampha premiered "Plastic 100°C" in a solo piano performance on the rooftop of Young Turks' London office.

Critical reception

Process was met with widespread critical acclaim. At Metacritic, which assigns a normalized rating out of 100 to reviews from mainstream publications, the album received an average score of 86, based on 28 reviews. Aggregator AnyDecentMusic? gave it 8.1 out of 10, based on their assessment of the critical consensus.

Alexis Petridis from The Guardian wrote, "Sisay shows off a genuinely individualistic approach to arrangement. The panic of "Plastic 100°C" floats along on a gentle wave of what sounds like harp or maybe koto. "Kora Sings" features a thrilling patchwork of scampering percussion, electronic noise and field recordings of rain and children speaking. The samples on "Reverse Faults" are melded into an insistent, slightly groggy pulse that's both compelling and unsettling. Nothing feels in thrall to current trends in R&B, either sonically or emotionally: Sisay may have been a constant, quiet presence on other people's records last year, but Process doesn't sound much like any of them. Instead, it's a weighty, powerful album with an identity entirely of its own. And while clearly not constructed with commercial ambition at the forefront of its mind, it's certainly good enough to make an unlikely star of the man behind it".

In NME, Jonny Ensall described the album as a "finely crafted and devastating take on the loss of his mother to cancer, as well as his inner turmoil at how success has dragged him away from his roots". Entertainment Weekly critic Eric Renner Brown said, "Sampha executes a sonically adventurous vision that's entirely his own and builds on his enormous potential". Marcus J. Moore from Pitchfork said that "it's a remarkable, meditative work, as he processes grief and navigates self-discovery". Clayton Purdom from The A.V. Club wrote: "Process is an exercise in finding beauty in even the tragedy of a parent's death, a record of singular probity and hard-earned optimism. It's the best R&B debut since FKA Twigs' LP1." Alexander Smail from The Skinny gave the album a perfect score, stating: "Process is an exercise in catharsis, a deep breath in that lays Sampha's soul bare through gorgeous vignettes of his life. He worries, he regrets, he aches. He's human."

Accolades
Process won the 2017 Mercury Prize. In 2019, Pitchfork included the single "(No One Knows Me) Like the Piano" on their list of the 200 Best Songs of the 2010s.

Track listingSample credits'''
 "Plastic 100°C" contains samples of Neil Armstrong talking with mission control after taking his first steps on the moon.
 "Under" contains a sample from "I Can Feel Your Love Slipping Away" performed by Samson and Delilah, written by Bruce Nazarian and Jerry Jones.
 "Timmy's Prayer" features samples from the Timmy Thomas recording "The Coldest Days of My Life", written by Eugene Booker Record and Carl H. Davis.

Personnel
Credits adapted from Process'' album liner notes.

 Sampha Sisay – writing, performing, production
 Rodaidh McDonald – production
 David Wrench – mixer
 Matt Colton – mastering
 Riccardo Damian – engineer
 John Foyle – additional vocal engineer (track 2)
 Josh Doughty – kora (track 3)
 Laura Groves – backing vocals (track 3)
 Pauli "The PSM" Stanley-McKenzie – drums and percussion (track 3)
 Ben Walker – artwork and photography (cover)
 Kanye West – writing (track 8)

Charts

Certifications

References

2017 debut albums
Alternative R&B albums
Sampha albums
Young Turks (record label) albums
Albums produced by Rodaidh McDonald
Mercury Prize-winning albums